Pee Dee Avenue Historic District is a national historic district located at Albemarle, Stanly County, North Carolina. The district encompasses 87 contributing buildings and 1 contributing site in a predominantly residential section of Albemarle.  They were built between about 1891 and 1947 and include notable examples of Queen Anne, Colonial Revival, and Bungalow / American Craftsman style residential architecture.  Notable buildings include the Brown-Parker House (c. 1891), Crowell House (c. 1900), Lambert-Hughes-Ferrell House (c. 1933), W. Berly Beaver House (1929-1936), David Augustus Holbrook House (1929-1936), Langley-Holbrook House (c. 1937), William Thomas Huckabee, Jr., House (1947), Robert Lee Smith Family House (c. 1900), and Wade F. Denning House (c. 1948-1950).

It was added to the National Register of Historic Places in 1998.

References

Historic districts on the National Register of Historic Places in North Carolina
Queen Anne architecture in North Carolina
Colonial Revival architecture in North Carolina
Buildings and structures in Stanly County, North Carolina
National Register of Historic Places in Stanly County, North Carolina